Jasem Delavari (born September 2, 1986 in Ghaemshahr, Iran) is an Iranian amateur boxer who competed in the Super Heavyweight (+91 kg) division at the 2006 Asian Games winning the bronze medal in a lost bout against Uzbekistan's eventual gold medalist Rustam Saidov 11-31.

At the 2007 World Amateur Boxing Championships in Chicago he lost to Michael Hunter.

References

1986 births
Living people
Asian Games silver medalists for Iran
Asian Games bronze medalists for Iran
Asian Games medalists in boxing
Boxers at the 2006 Asian Games
Boxers at the 2014 Asian Games
Iranian male boxers
Medalists at the 2006 Asian Games
Medalists at the 2014 Asian Games
Super-heavyweight boxers
People from Qaem Shahr
Sportspeople from Mazandaran province
21st-century Iranian people
20th-century Iranian people